The Lesser Slave River (Cree Iyaghchi Eennu Sepe, translation: "River of the Strange People") is a river in central Alberta, Canada. It is a major tributary of the Athabasca River.

The Lesser Slave Lake and the river were the main links to the Peace River district until the beginning of the 20th century, when the construction of the Northern Alberta Railway facilitated transportation in the area.

Course
The river originates from the Lesser Slave Lake at the town of Slave Lake. The average discharge at the mouth of the lake is 20 m³/s. It flows eastwards for 61 km, and merges with the Athabasca River at the village of Smith. From its headwaters of South Heart River, it has a total length of more than 280 km.

Tributaries
Through Lesser Slave Lake
Assineau River
Driftpile River
Little Driftpile River
South Heart River
East Prairie River, West Prairie River, North Heart River
Marten River
Swan River
Inverness River, Moosehorn River

Downstream of Lesser Slave Lake
Sawridge Creek
Eating Creek
Mitsue Creek
Mitsue Lake, Florida Creek
Muskeg Creek
Otauwau River
Salteux River
Driftwood River
Fawcett River

See also
Geography of Alberta
List of Alberta rivers

References

Rivers of Alberta